Marco Aurelio Robles Méndez (8 November 1905, in Aguadulce – 14 April 1990, in Miami) was President of Panama from October 1, 1964 to September 30, 1968. He studied at the University of Panama and at the Sorbonne. Before his presidency, he served on diplomatic missions in France and United Kingdom and also as Minister of Justice (1960–1964).

Robles was the cousin of his predecessor, Roberto Francisco Chiari.

On April 16, 1990, he died in Miami from a long illness.

References

1905 births
1990 deaths
People from Aguadulce District
Presidents of Panama
Justice ministers of Panama